Isaiah Tass (born 19 August 1999) is an Australian rugby league footballer who plays as a  for the South Sydney Rabbitohs in the NRL.

Background
Tass was born in Mackay and played his junior rugby league with the Norths Devils. Tass of Indigenous Australian and Vanuatuan descent.

Playing career
Tass made his first grade debut in round 6 of the 2022 NRL season for South Sydney against the Canterbury-Bankstown Bulldogs scoring a try during Souths 36-16 victory.
Tass played 16 games for South Sydney in the 2022 NRL season including all three of the clubs finals matches as they reached the preliminary final for a fifth straight season.  Souths would lose in the preliminary final to eventual premiers Penrith 32-12.

References

External links
South Sydney Rabbitohs profile

1999 births
Living people
Australian people of Vanuatuan descent
Australian rugby league players
Indigenous Australian rugby league players
Rugby league centres
Rugby league players from Mackay, Queensland
South Sydney Rabbitohs players